is a passenger railway station located in the city of Kaizuka, Osaka Prefecture, Japan, operated by the private railway operator Mizuma Railway.

Lines

Layout
The station consists of one side platform serving a single bi-directional track.The station is unattended.

Adjacent stations

History
Mikayamaguchi Station opened on November 23, 1960.

Passenger statistics
In fiscal 2019, the station was used by an average of 304 passengers daily.

Surrounding area
 Kaizuka City Zenbei Land (Astronomical Museum)
Kaizuka City Higashiyama Elementary School (closest to Mitsumatsu Station next door)
Kaizuka City Eiju Elementary School
Kaizuka Municipal Third Junior High School
Osaka Kawasaki Rehabilitation University Ground

See also
 List of railway stations in Japan

Reference

External links

 Schedule 

Railway stations in Japan opened in 1960
Railway stations in Osaka Prefecture
Kaizuka, Osaka